Here Are the Young Men is a 2020 drama film written and directed by Eoin Macken, based on the novel of the same name by Rob Doyle. It stars Dean-Charles Chapman, Finn Cole, Anya Taylor-Joy, Ferdia Walsh-Peelo, Travis Fimmel and Conleth Hill. The title is a quote from the song "Decades" which closes the album Closer (1980) by Joy Division.

The film had its world premiere at the Galway Film Fleadh on 11 July 2020. It was released in the United States on 27 April 2021, by Well Go USA Entertainment, and in the United Kingdom on 30 April 2021, by Signature Entertainment.

Cast
 Dean-Charles Chapman as Matthew Connolly
 Finn Cole as Joseph Kearney
 Anya Taylor-Joy as Jen
 Ferdia Walsh-Peelo as Rez
 Conleth Hill as Mark Kearney
 Travis Fimmel as TV Presenter
 Emmett J. Scanlan as Homeless Man
 Chris Newman as Dwayne Kearney
 Ralph Ineson as Mr Landerton
 Susan Lynch as Lynn Connolly
 Lola Petticrew as Julie
 Noomi Rapace as Angel Dust
 Eoin Macken as Homeless American

Production
In August 2018, it was announced Dean-Charles Chapman, Finn Cole, Anya Taylor-Joy, Ferdia Walsh-Peelo, Conleth Hill and Lola Petticrew joined the cast of the film, with Eoin Macken directing from a screenplay by Macken and Rob Doyle, based upon the novel of the same name, written by Doyle. Richard Bolger, Noah Haeussner, Edwina Casey served as producers on the film, while Paul W. S. Anderson, Andrew Davies Gans, Conor Barry and Michael Raimondi served as executive producers under their Hail Mary Pictures and Union Entertainment Group banners, respectively. In September 2018, Ralph Ineson and Susan Lynch joined the cast of the film. In November 2019, it was announced Travis Fimmel had joined the cast of the film.

Filming
Principal photography began in August 2018 in Ireland.

Release
The film had its world premiere at the Galway Film Fleadh on 11 July 2020. In November 2020, Well Go USA Entertainment and Signature Entertainment acquired Irish, UK and US distribution rights to the film respectively. It is scheduled to be released in the United States on 27 April 2021, and the United Kingdom on 30 April 2021.

Reception

Critical reception
The critics consensus reads "Strong acting and good intentions aren't enough to overcome all the obvious turns in Here Are the Young Men's derivative story."

References

External links

2020 films
American drama films
Irish drama films
American independent films
Irish independent films
2020 drama films
Films based on novels
Films shot in Ireland
English-language Irish films
2020s English-language films
2020s American films